Hayward City Hall is the third and current Hayward city hall building, located in downtown Hayward, California, United States, next to the Hayward BART Station. The city hall opened in January 1998, replacing the abandoned City Center Building, which served as Hayward's city hall for 29 years from 1969 to 1998. Hayward's first city hall, which is also closed to the public, is now in the Alex Giualini Plaza, three blocks away.

Earthquake preparedness
Since the building is located close to the Hayward Fault, it was designed to withstand a major earthquake. The inability of the Hayward City Center building to withstand a major earthquake, shown by damage to it from the 1989 Loma Prieta earthquake, was the main motivation for the new city hall's construction.

Details
The interior of the building contains a time capsule, to be opened on January 10, 2048, on the 50th anniversary of the building's dedication.

Events
The park and plaza facing the city hall is host to various city sponsored events, including a weekly farmer's market, and in July, the Hayward-Russell City Blues Festival. The city hall contains an art gallery run by the Hayward Arts Council. in 2011, the gallery hosted a major exhibition of the work of Corita Kent.

References

City halls in California
Buildings and structures in Hayward, California
Government of Hayward, California
Government buildings completed in 1998
1990s architecture in the United States